John Bellasis (died 1808) was a British Major-General who was commanding the forces at Bombay. He first went to India in 1763. He died in Bombay at age 64. He married Ann, daughter of John Hutchins, who died in Bombay in 1797.

References

Year of birth missing
1808 deaths
British East India Company Army generals